The Junkers Ju 187 was a German projected dive bomber designed to replace the aging Junkers Ju 87 Stuka. The Ju 187 was cancelled in 1943.

Design 
By the time of the Battle of Britain the Junkers Ju 87 Stuka had proved very vulnerable to enemy fighters and needed replacement, so after rejection of the Ju 87F proposal a new dive bomber was designed under the designation Ju 187.

The projected aircraft kept some of the features of the earlier Ju 87, such as the inverted gull wing and two man crew. It would have added retractable landing gear, as well as improved armour and armament. Most notably, the Ju 187 incorporated a rotating vertical tail. When rotated down, the tail would give the air gunner, armed with a rear turret, an unobstructed field of fire. It is not known how the aircraft would have handled with the tail rotated.

The Ju 187 project was cancelled by the Reich Air Ministry in autumn 1943 because the aircraft's projected performance, when fully loaded, was estimated to be no better than the latest Ju 87D variant.

Specifications (Ju 187 estimated)

References

Further reading
 
 RLM: V-Muster-Programm, November 1942
 JFM AG: Anhang I der Aufsichts- und Verwaltungsratsitzung der JFM AG am 15. und 16. Mai 1942
 JFM AG: Vierteljahresbericht für den Aufsichtsrat der JFM AG – Januar bis März 1942

External links

Inverted gull-wing aircraft
1940s German bomber aircraft
World War II dive bombers
Ju 187